is a private university, located in the city of Iwaki, Fukushima, Japan.

History
Higashi Nippon International University was established in 1995. The predecessor of the school was founded in 1903 as the Iwaki Junior College.

Faculties & Courses
Faculty of Economic Informatics
Department of Economic Information Science
School of Social & Environmental Service
Department of Social Welfare 
Intensive Japanese Language Course for Overseas Students

External links
 

Educational institutions established in 1903
Private universities and colleges in Japan
Confucian universities and colleges
Universities and colleges in Fukushima Prefecture
1903 establishments in Japan
Iwaki, Fukushima